Rashkan or Reshkan or Rashakan may refer to:
 Reshkan, Kerman
 Rashkan, Sistan and Baluchestan
 Rashkan, West Azerbaijan
 Rashkan-e Sofla, West Azerbaijan Province
 Rashkan castle, near Tehran

See also
Raskhan, Indian poet